G'day is the second studio album by Finnish jazz trio Trio Töykeät. It was released in January 1993 under EmArcy Records and is available through their Jazz Finland reseller.

Track listing

Personnel
Eerik Siikasaari - Bass
Rami Eskelinen - Drums
Heikki Savolainen - Engineer, Producer
IIro Rantala - Piano
Rick Margitza - Saxophone
Antti Murto - Synthesizer

External links

1993 albums
Trio Töykeät albums
EmArcy Records albums